Russia competed at the 2015 UCI Track Cycling World Championships in Saint-Quentin-en-Yvelines at the Vélodrome de Saint-Quentin-en-Yvelines from 18–22 February 2015. A team of 27 cyclists (13 women, 14 men) was announced to represent the country in the event.

Results

Men

Sources

Women

Sources

2016 

Russia competed at the 2016 UCI Track Cycling World Championships at the Lee Valley VeloPark in London, United Kingdom from 2–4 March 2016. A team of 29 cyclists (13 women, 16 men) was announced to represent the country in the event.

Riders

Men
Ages as of 2 March 2016

Women
Ages as of 2 March 2016

Results

Men

Sources

Women

Sources

References

Track
Nations at the UCI Track Cycling World Championships